Breton Peasant Women is an 1894 oil on canvas painting by Paul Gauguin of two Breton peasant women in conversation. It is now in the Musée d'Orsay in Paris.

References

1894 paintings
Paintings in the collection of the Musée d'Orsay
Paintings by Paul Gauguin